

This is a list of sieges, land and naval battles of the Hundred Days or War of the Seventh Coalition (20 March – 8 July 1815, or 15 March – 16 August 1815, depending on periodisation). It includes:
 the Waterloo campaign (8 June – 8 July 1815);
 the Neapolitan War (15 March – 20 May 1815), plus the Siege of Gaeta (1815) (28 May – 8 August 1815);
 the minor campaigns of 1815 (18 June – 7 July 1815), plus the reduction of the French fortresses in 1815 (8 July – 16 August 1815); and
 the Invasion of Guadeloupe (1815) (8–10 August 1815).

See also 
 List of battles of the War of the First Coalition
 List of battles of the War of the Second Coalition
 List of battles of the War of the Third Coalition
 List of battles of the War of the Fourth Coalition
 List of battles of the War of the Fifth Coalition
 List of battles of the War of the Sixth Coalition
 List of battles of the French invasion of Russia

Notes

References 

Hundred Days